Elections to the Himachal Pradesh Legislative Assembly were held in March 1972 to elect members of the 68 constituencies in Himachal Pradesh, India. The Indian National Congress won the popular vote and a majority of seats and Yashwant Singh Parmar was reappointed as the Chief Minister of Himachal Pradesh. The number of constituencies was set as 68 by the recommendation of the Delimitation Commission of India.

Result

Elected members

See also
List of constituencies of the Himachal Pradesh Legislative Assembly
1972 elections in India

References

State Assembly elections in Himachal Pradesh
1970s in Himachal Pradesh
Himachal Pradesh